Sir John Dawson Laurie, 1st Baronet, TD, JP (12 September 1872 – 20 July 1954) was Lord Mayor of London from 1941 to 1942.

See also 
 Laurie baronets

References 
 https://www.ukwhoswho.com/view/10.1093/ww/9780199540891.001.0001/ww-9780199540884-e-239669

1872 births
1954 deaths
Knights Bachelor
Queen's Own Royal West Kent Regiment officers
English justices of the peace
Baronets in the Baronetage of the United Kingdom
Sheriffs of the City of London
Lord mayors of London